Ning Guangyou (born December 15, 1981), is a Chinese mixed martial artist who competes in the bantamweight division. He won his contract through an 8-man tournament on The Ultimate Fighter: China.

Mixed martial arts career

Early professional career
Ning made his professional mixed martial arts debut in 2007, competing primarily for regional promotions in China, with most of his fights taking place in Art of War Fighting Championship.  In that time, Ning compiled a record of 3-2-1.

The Ultimate Fighter: China
In the fall of 2013, it was announced that Ning had been selected as one of the Featherweights participants for Team Sky Dragons on the inaugural season of The Ultimate Fighter: China.

Ning won his first fight on the show, defeating Shih Liang by knockout in the second round.  Ning would then defeat Rocky Lee by knockout in the second round as well to advance to the finals.

Ultimate Fighting Championship

Ning was scheduled to make his official debut against fellow castmate Yang Jianping in the Featherweight finals on The Ultimate Fighter: China Finale.  However, this bout had to be rescheduled after Yang got injured.  The bout would eventually take place in Macau at UFC Fight Night: Bisping vs Le, in which Ning would beat Yang to win the Ultimate Fighter China Featherweight final. 

Ning next faced Royston Wee in a Featherweight bout on May 16, 2015 at UFC Fight Night: Edgar vs Faber.  Ning defeated Wee via a second round TKO.

After his win over Wee, Ning dropped down to Bantamweight for the first time in his career to fight Marco Beltrán at UFC Fight Night: Henderson vs Masvidal, in which Ning lost the fight via a split decision.

Guangyou was expected to face Marlon Vera on August 20, 2016 at UFC 202. Subsequently on August 9 it was revealed that Guangyou had tested positive for trace amounts of clenbuterol in relation to an out-of-competition drug test taken on May 19. Guangyou was cleared of wrongdoing after it was determined by USADA that he had possibly ingested tainted meat from China. As a result, he will not be punished in any way. The bout was rescheduled to take place a week later at UFC on Fox 21. In turn, the bout was postponed again due to alleged visa issues for Guangyou, which restricted the timing of his travel. The pairing eventually took place at featherweight on November 27, 2016 at UFC Fight Night 101. He lost the fight via unanimous decision.

In May 2017, Guangyou was released from the company.

Mixed martial arts record

|-
|Loss
|align=center|5–4–1
|Marlon Vera
|Decision (unanimous)
|UFC Fight Night: Whittaker vs. Brunson
|
|align=center|3
|align=center|5:00
|Melbourne, Australia
| 
|-
|Loss
|align=center|5–3–1
|Marco Beltrán
|Decision (split)
|UFC Fight Night: Henderson vs. Masvidal
|
|align=center|3
|align=center|5:00
|Seoul, South Korea
|
|-
|Win
|align=center|5–2–1
|Royston Wee
|TKO (punches and elbows)
|UFC Fight Night: Edgar vs. Faber
|
|align=center|2
|align=center|4:59
|Manila, Philippines
|
|-
|Win
|align=center|4–2–1
|Jianping Yang
|Decision (unanimous)
|UFC Fight Night: Bisping vs. Le
|
|align=center|3
|align=center|5:00
|Macau, SAR, China
|
|-
|Win
|align=center|3–2–1
|Zhouwen Jiang
|TKO (punches)
|RUFF 9
|
|align=center|2
|align=center|1:43
|Sanya, China
|
|-
|Loss
|align=center|2–2–1
|A Sol Kwon
|Decision (unanimous)
|Legend Fighting Championship 3
|
|align=center|3
|align=center|5:00
|Hong Kong, SAR, China
|
|-
|Loss
|align=center|2–1–1
|Kang Kyung-ho
|Submission (triangle choke)
|Art Of War Fighting Championship 13
|
|align=center|1
|align=center|7:34
|Beijing, China
|
|-
|Win
|align=center|2–0–1
|Sirojiddin Izakbaev
|Submission (rear-naked choke)
|Art of War Fighting Championship 12
|
|align=center|1
|align=center|4:51
|Beijing, China
|
|-
|Win
|align=center|1–0–1
|Kazuto Senga
|TKO (punches)
|Art of War Fighting Championship 11
|
|align=center|1
|align=center|2:13
|Beijing, China
|
|-
|Draw
|align=center|0–0–1
|Yuan Long
|Draw
|Art of War Fighting Championship 8
|
|align=center|1
|align=center|15:00
|Beijing, China
|
|-

Mixed martial arts exhibition record

|-
|Win
|align=center|2–0
|Rocky Lee
|KO (punches)
|The Ultimate Fighter: China
|
|align=center|1
|align=center|N/A
|Beijing, China
|
|-
|Win
|align=center|1–0
|Shih Liang
|KO (punches)
|The Ultimate Fighter: China
|
|align=center|2
|align=center|N/A
|Beijing, China
|
|-

See also
 List of current UFC fighters
 List of male mixed martial artists

References

External links
 
 

1981 births
Living people
Chinese male mixed martial artists
Featherweight mixed martial artists
Bantamweight mixed martial artists
Ultimate Fighting Championship male fighters